The 1908 United States presidential election in Iowa took place on November 3, 1908 as part of the 1908 United States presidential election. Voters chose 13 representatives, or electors to the Electoral College, who voted for president and vice president.

Iowa voted for the Republican nominee, Secretary of War William Howard Taft, over the Democratic nominee, former U.S. Representative William Jennings Bryan. Taft won the state by a margin of 15.04%.

Results

Results by county

See also
 United States presidential elections in Iowa

References

Iowa
1908
1908 Iowa elections